Atherton Racing, competing officially as Trek Factory Racing, formerly as GT Factory Racing , is a professional mountain bike racing team competing in the World Cup and World Champs, as well as national level events, in the downhill category. The team began as Animal Commençal.

Palmarès

2008
1st DH, Alpine Bikes Winter Series, Scotland - Gee Atherton
1st DH, Alpine Bikes Winter series, Scotland - Rachel Atherton
1st DH, Maxxis Cup, Gouveia, Portugal - Gee Atherton
1st DH, Maxxis Cup, Gouveia, Portugal - Rachel Atherton
2nd DH, Maxxis Cup, Gouveia, Portugal - Dan Atherton
1st DH, NPS, Round 1, Ae Forest, Scotland - Gee Atherton
1st  DH, UCI Mountain Bike World Cup, Round 1, Maribor, Slovenia - Rachel Atherton
1st  DH, Canadian Open, Kokanee Crankworx, Whistler, Canada - Rachel Atherton
1st DH, Monster Energy Garbanzo Downhill, Kokanee Crankworx, Whistler, Canada - Gee Atherton
1st DH, Monster Energy Garbanzo Downhill, Kokanee Crankworx, Whistler, Canada - Rachel Atherton
1st  DH, UCI Mountain Bike World Cup, Round 2, Vallnord, Andorra - Gee Atherton
1st  DH, UCI Mountain Bike World Cup, Round 2, Vallnord, Andorra - Rachel Atherton
1st  4X, UCI Mountain Bike World Cup, Round 2, Vallnord, Andorra - Dan Atherton
3rd DH, UCI Mountain Bike World Cup, Round 3, Fort William, Scotland - Rachel Atherton
1st  DH, UCI Mountain Bike & Trials World Championships, Trentino, Italy - Gee Atherton
1st  DH, UCI Mountain Bike & Trials World Championships, Trentino, Italy - Rachel Atherton
1st  DH, UCI Mountain Bike World Cup, Round 4, Mont-Sainte-Anne, Canada - Rachel Atherton
1st  DH, UCI Mountain Bike World Cup, Round 5, Bromont, Canada - Rachel Atherton
2nd DH, UCI Mountain Bike World Cup, Round 6, Canberra, Australia - Rachel Atherton
1st  DH, UCI Mountain Bike World Cup, Round 7, Schladming, Austria - Rachel Atherton
1st  DH, UCI Mountain Bike World Cup, Series Overall - Rachel Atherton
3rd DH, UCI Mountain Bike World Cup, Series Overall - Gee Atherton

2009

2013 Team roster

References

External links 
AthertonRacing.co.uk
AnimalCommencal.com
Atherton Racing Profiles, Silverfish

Mountain biking teams and clubs
Mountain biking in the United Kingdom
Cycling teams established in 2007
Cycling teams based in the United Kingdom